Sairandhari is a 1920 Indian film based on an episode from the Mahabharata and directed by Baburao Painter and Produced by Maharashtra Film Company. V. Shantaram remade it as Sairandhri in 1933.

Cast
 Balasabeb Yadav as Bheema
 Zunzharrao Pawar as Keechak
 Kamaladevi as Sairandhri
 Kishabapu Bakre 
 Baburao Pendharkar as Krishna
 Ravji Mhaskar 
 Ganpat Bakre as King Veerat
 Sushiladevi as Sudeshna
 Sitarampat Kulkarni
 Shivram Vashikar
 Vishnupant Govind Damle

References

External links

1920 films
Indian black-and-white films
Indian silent films